Pipeline Infrastructure Limited or East West Gas Pipeline (EWPL) is a project implemented to transport gas from Kakinada (Andhra Pradesh) to Bharuch (Gujarat) including various spurs and interconnects on the way. EWPL traverses through the Indian states of Andhra Pradesh, Telangana, Karnataka, Maharashtra and Gujarat. EWPL has been authorized as a common carrier pipeline. It is a wholly owned subsidiary of India Infrastructure Trust, which is owned by Brookfield Asset Management.
The East West Gas Pipeline supplies Natural gas to RIL's vast petrochemical complex at Gujarat and delivers gas to numerous customers via branch line connections along its length. The pipeline system features multiple compressor stations, numerous metering facilities at branch take-offs and an advanced control and communications network. The project is the first and largest privately owned cross-country pipeline in India and the backbone of India's burgeoning natural gas grid.

Gas source
The current gas source for EWPL is KG-D6 gas block located in Krishna Godavari Basin, 30 to 50 km offshore of the east coast of India. RIL has set up an Onshore Terminal at Gadimoga near Kakinada.

System configuration
EWPL is a  uniform diameter (API 5L Grade X-70) pipeline across the entire trunk length of around 1375 km with wall thicknesses 17.2, 20.7 and 25.4 mm depending on the code requirement. The pipeline is 3LPE (three layer polyethylene) coated; internally epoxy lined, helically spiral submerged arc welded (for 17.2 mm) and longitudinal submerged arc welded (for 20.7 mm and 25.4 mm). Impressed current cathodic protection system has been provided to supplement the coating system for protection against external corrosion. Maximum Allowable Operating Pressure (MAOP) of the pipeline is 98.0 bar(g).

Gas price
In 2020, Indian government fixed the natural gas price at producer end (on shore point) as US on net calorific value (NCV) basis from KG-D6 field. However the enhanced price would be applicable only after compensating the shortfall gas in the previous years.

GP = 2.5 + (OP – 25) ^0.15

where OP is the annual average Brent crude price for the previous FY, with a cap of $60 per barrel
and a floor of $25 per barrel.  As the annual Brent price has always been above $60 from 2007 to 2014, the revised gas price at $5.61 during the year 2014 is in excess of the applicable maximum price by nearly 20%.

Controversies

Money laundering 
EWPL is under investigation by the Indian regulators over potential laundering of $1.2 bn by the company.

See also
Kandla-Gorakhpur LPG Pipeline
HVJ Gas Pipeline

References

External links
 Company website

Reliance Industries
Energy in Andhra Pradesh
Natural gas pipelines in India
Energy in Gujarat
Energy in Telangana
Brookfield Asset Management
2008 establishments in India
Infrastructure completed in 2008